Philippe Bergeroo (born 28 January 1954) is a French former professional footballer who played as a goalkeeper. For France, he earned a total number of three international caps during the late 1970s, early 1980s. He was a member of the French squad in the 1986 FIFA World Cup and the team that won the European Championship in 1984.

Later on he became a football manager, with Paris Saint-Germain and Stade Rennais.

Honours
Titles
UEFA European Championship: 1984
Orders
Officier of the Ordre national du Mérite: 1998

References

1954 births
Living people
Sportspeople from Pyrénées-Atlantiques
French footballers
France international footballers
Ligue 1 players
FC Girondins de Bordeaux players
Lille OSC players
Toulouse FC players
Association football goalkeepers
UEFA Euro 1984 players
UEFA European Championship-winning players
1986 FIFA World Cup players
French football managers
France women's national football team managers
Paris Saint-Germain F.C. managers
Stade Rennais F.C. managers
Ligue 1 managers
2015 FIFA Women's World Cup managers
Officers of the Ordre national du Mérite
Footballers from Nouvelle-Aquitaine